Oleg Chmyrikov (born 8 February 1996) is a Belarusian professional footballer.

On 2 December 2021 Chmyrikov was fined and banned from Belarusian football for 1 year for involvement in match-fixing and betting.

References

External links
 
 
 Profile at Gomel website

1996 births
Living people
Belarusian footballers
Association football defenders
FC Gomel players
FC Belshina Bobruisk players
FC Dnepr Mogilev players
FC Slutsk players
FC Khimik Svetlogorsk players
People from Mogilev
Sportspeople from Mogilev Region